Lowden is a city in Cedar County, Iowa, United States. The population was 807 at the time of the 2020 census.

History
Lowden (historically spelled Louden) was platted in 1857 at the time the Chicago and North Western Railway was projected to be built in the neighborhood. It is named after Loudonville, Ohio, the former hometown of one of its early settlers.

Geography
Lowden is located at  (41.857847, -90.925971).

Demographics

2010 census
As of the census of 2010, there were 789 people, 346 households, and 221 families living in the city. The racial makeup of the city was 99.1% White, 0.1% African American, 0.3% from other races, and 0.5% from two or more races. Hispanic or Latino of any race were 0.8% of the population.

There were 346 households, of which 27.5% had children under the age of 18 living with them, 49.4% were married couples living together, 8.7% had a female householder with no husband present, 5.8% had a male householder with no wife present, and 36.1% were non-families. 31.8% of all households were made up of individuals, and 20.5% had someone living alone who was 65 years of age or older. The average household size was 2.28 and the average family size was 2.82.

The median age in the city was 42.9 years. 22.8% of residents were under the age of 18; 7.6% were between the ages of 18 and 24; 22.1% were from 25 to 44; 23.8% were from 45 to 64; and 23.6% were 65 years of age or older. The gender makeup of the city was 47.9% male and 52.1% female.

2000 census
As of the census of 2000, there were 794 people, 342 households, and 230 families living in the city. The racial makeup of the city was 99.12% White, 0.13% African American, 0.13% Asian, 0.63% from other races. Hispanic or Latino of any race were 1.13% of the population.

There were 342 households, out of which 26.3% had children under the age of 18 living with them, 59.1% were married couples living together, 6.1% had a female householder with no husband present, and 32.5% were non-families. 30.4% of all households were made up of individuals, and 18.1% had someone living alone who was 65 years of age or older. The average household size was 2.32 and the average family size was 2.84.

23.9% are under the age of 18, 4.5% from 18 to 24, 26.6% from 25 to 44, 21.5% from 45 to 64, and 23.4% who were 65 years of age or older. The median age was 42 years. For every 100 females, there were 92.3 males. For every 100 females age 18 and over, there were 84.1 males.

The median income for a household in the city was $35,714, and the median income for a family was $45,735. Males had a median income of $32,679 versus $24,063 for females. The per capita income for the city was $18,303. About 4.3% of families and 6.0% of the population were below the poverty line, including 4.3% of those under age 18 and 14.5% of those age 65 or over.

Education
The North Cedar Community School District serves the community.  It was established on July 1, 1995 by the merger of the Clarence-Lowden Community School District and the Lincoln Community School District. The former was formed on July 1, 1973 by the merger of the Clarence and Lowden school districts.

References

Cities in Cedar County, Iowa
Cities in Iowa
1857 establishments in Iowa